Hunnewell is a city in Sumner County, Kansas, United States.  As of the 2020 census, the population of the city was 44.

History
Hunnewell was founded in 1880. It was named for Boston financier and railway owner H. H. Hunnewell.

In its heyday, Hunnewell was serving as a shipping point for Texas cattle, and was a prosperous cattle town during the 1880s. The Leavenworth, Lawrence and Galveston Railroad provided quick access to the Kansas City, Kansas stockyards, and in the towns heyday it had one hotel, two general stores, one barber shop, two dance halls, and eight saloons. With little more than railroad workers and cowboys, violence was common. There were no lawmen to speak of during the 1880s in or around that area, and typically cattle rustling and other crimes were dealt with by the ranchers themselves. This culminated in the Hunnewell, Kansas Gunfight, on October 5, 1884.

A post office was opened in Hunnewell in 1880, and remained in operation until it was discontinued in 1960.

Geography
Hunnewell is located at  (37.004497, -97.407234).

Demographics

2010 census
As of the census of 2010, there were 67 people, 26 households, and 20 families residing in the city. The racial makeup of the city was 92.5% White, 6.0% Native American, and 1.5% from two or more races.

There were 26 households, of which 34.6% had children under the age of 18 living with them, 65.4% were married couples living together, 11.5% had a female householder with no husband present, and 23.1% were non-families. 19.2% of all households were made up of individuals, and 3.8% had someone living alone who was 65 years of age or older. The average household size was 2.58 and the average family size was 2.90.

The median age in the city was 42.3 years. 28.4% of residents were under the age of 18; 3.1% were between the ages of 18 and 24; 23.9% were from 25 to 44; 35.9% were from 45 to 64; and 9% were 65 years of age or older. The gender makeup of the city was 52.2% male and 47.8% female.

2000 census
As of the census of 2000, there were 83 people, 24 households, and 21 families residing in the city. The racial makeup of the city was 97.59% White and 2.41% Native American.

There were 24 households, out of which 58.3% had children under the age of 18 living with them, 79.2% were married couples living together, 8.3% had a female householder with no husband present, and 12.5% were non-families. 8.3% of all households were made up of individuals, and 4.2% had someone living alone who was 65 years of age or older. The average household size was 3.46 and the average family size was 3.76.

In the city, the population was spread out, with 42.2% under the age of 18, 4.8% from 18 to 24, 27.7% from 25 to 44, 19.3% from 45 to 64, and 6.0% who were 65 years of age or older. The median age was 28 years. For every 100 females, there were 97.6 males. For every 100 females age 18 and over, there were 100.0 males.

The median income for a household in the city was $16,875, and the median income for a family was $49,375. Males had a median income of $67,917 versus $23,750 for females. The per capita income for the city was $12,729. There were 13.3% of families and 20.7% of the population living below the poverty line, including no under eighteens and none of those over 64.

Education
The community is served by South Haven USD 509 public school district.

Gallery

References

Further reading

External links
 Hunnewell - Directory of Public Officials
 Historic images of Hunnewell, Special Photo Collections at Wichita State University Library
 Hunnewell city map, KDOT

Cities in Kansas
Cities in Sumner County, Kansas
Wichita, KS Metropolitan Statistical Area